Ziyaret is a village in the Kozluk District, Batman Province, Turkey. The village is populated by Kurds of the Bekiran tribe and had a population of 273 in 2021.

The hamlets of Canlar, Çayönü and Yukarı Ziyaret are attached to the village.

References

Villages in Kozluk District

Kurdish settlements in Batman Province